Pi Epsilon is an environmental sciences Honor Society open to both graduate and undergraduate students as well as professionals and scientists working in the field. Pi Epsilon was founded at Wright State University by the Environmental Sciences PhD student body in October, 2003. The purpose of Pi Epsilon is to promote the study of environmental sciences through recognition of exemplary scholarly and professional
activity. Environmental science is understood to be the study of our environment and all stressors acting on it; chemical, physical, and biological.  The Society seeks to promote interdisciplinary studies, and interactions between industry and academia to further the study of environmental science.

As a new honor society, Pi Epsilon currently has five chapters and is in the process of expanding to several more universities throughout the United States.  The five current chapters are the Alpha chapter located at Wright State University in Ohio, the Beta chapter located at the University of Virginia, and the University of South Florida, as well as chapters located at Lemoyne College, and Adelphi University.

Membership requirements 
Lifetime membership is open to undergraduate and graduate students in the environmental and natural sciences who meet the following requirements:
 Have a cumulative GPA of at least 3.30 out of 4.00
 Have completed at least 30 semester hours (45 quarter) of total coursework for undergraduates and at least 6 semester (8 quarter) hours of total coursework for graduate students
 Have completed at least three semester or quarter-length courses in environmental science (of which at least one is not an introductory course) with a cumulative GPA in those courses of at least 3.30 out of 4.00
 If no environmental science courses are available, courses from biology, chemistry, geology, and physics will be accepted with the following requirements:
 Courses must be from three of the four above disciplines
 The primary discipline of study must not exceed 75% of the total science coursework
 Cumulative science GPA must be at least 3.30 out of 4.00

References

External links
 Pi Epsilon's National Website
 Pi Epsilon News Release

Honor societies
Organizations established in 2003